"Days of Future Future" is the eighteenth episode of the twenty-fifth season of the American animated television series The Simpsons and the 548th episode of the series. It first aired on the Fox network in the United States on April 13, 2014. It was written by J. Stewart Burns and directed by Bob Anderson. The episode follows the 2011 episode "Holidays of Future Passed", set 30 years from the present. In this futuristic installment, Bart goes to a clinic to rid himself of his feelings for his ex-wife Jenda (who is now dating a xenomorph-like alien named Jerry), Lisa must choose whether or not to cure her zombie husband Milhouse after he gets bitten by a homeless zombie, and Marge (after putting up with years of Homer dying and being cloned back to life by Professor Frink) loads Homer onto a flatscreen monitor and throws him out of the house.

Plot
Marge wakes to find Homer atop of the kitchen table in nothing but his underwear, and gives him advice on his health. Just when Homer seems to be taking Marge's words to heart, he marches upstairs to tell his wife that he will take his health seriously, only to fall down the stairs and die. At his funeral, Professor Frink announces that he has made a clone of Homer, and Marge warns Homer to take this second chance seriously. After thirty years of clones dying, Frink cannot bring Homer back, but has stored his memory in a flash drive, which he plugs into a television screen. When Marge realizes that her husband is just a face on a screen, she is fed up with him, and gives the flash drive to Bart, so that Homer can reside with him until she can figure out a way to get used to him in his current form.

Bart shows Homer his new digs, an abandoned classroom at Springfield Elementary. As soon as a glum Bart sends his two sons to his ex-wife Jenda's house, he needs advice more than ever now, but Homer is of no use when the monitor freezes. Working at a dinosaur amusement park, Bart laments that he misses his children. Elsewhere, at Lisa's zombie soup kitchen, her husband Milhouse is attacked by a zombie. Unable to move on from his ex, Bart sees a targeted billboard telling him to move on using shock therapy that makes him forget. After the procedure, Bart visits Marge, who claims to not miss Homer that much, but in an attempt to initiate a conversation between her and Homer, he sees she does miss Homer.

Homer returns to normal when Bart starts to get back into the dating scene, and sleeps with one woman after another, including Lisa's former teacher, Miss Hoover. At Bart's apartment, Homer gets a new lease of life in a robot suit. Bart's sons visit him and ask him to help Jenda out with her depression. She shows up in tears, telling Bart that after she bought a shedding tank for Jerry, her alien boyfriend, he humiliated her and broke up with her for someone else. Bart comforts her by mentioning he is trying to get his life on track, and her crying is a reminder of what he lost. Jenda is impressed by Bart's newfound maturity and invites him to dinner. It goes well and the two decide to patch up their relationship again. However, the two later fall into their bad habits of not paying attention to each other that destroyed their marriage the first time, and become unsure whether to continue working things out. Meanwhile, Lisa and zombie Milhouse are attacked by bullies, and Lisa actually finds it attractive that Milhouse fights them off. She does not want him cured and is stalked by Dr. Hibbert who is not happy about her decision.

Bart and Lisa both go to Moe's to deal with their respective marital problems, where Marge tells them to stick through. She then electrocutes herself to death in order to live in the flash drive with Homer. Milhouse is cured and Bart moves on from Jenda, discovering that she has started seeing Jerry again.

Bart then finds himself back in the therapist's chair, and learns that what he experienced was just a neural implant. Bart and Lisa visit Marge and find out that she and Homer have finally gotten back together, and she gave him a new robot body and personality. Bart recommends Lisa try moving on if things do not work out with her and Milhouse, but Lisa points out that Milhouse is still a zombie and there is no cure, much to her own affection, and Santa's Little Helper (who is now a hybrid of him and the family cat) is seen talking.

Reception
Dennis Perkins of The A.V. Club gave the episode a C, saying "Things are even worse for The Simpsons after tonight's sequel, 'Days Of Future Future,' where Burns returns to the (it seems) inevitable sci-fi future of the series and limits the show's world even more. Losing much of the heart of its predecessor in favor of the sort of ill-conceived and contradictory character arcs the latter, scattershot Simpsons has become notorious for, 'Days Of Future Future' reveals a series willing to shrug off what it still could be. Instead, this future Simpsons world seems just a playground for writers to use up whatever Futurama jokes they had left over."

Tony Sokol of Den of Geek gave the episode four out of five stars, saying "The Simpsonss 'Days of Future Future' is a laugh every 2.5 seconds, allowing for wind resistance. A very worthy entry into what will someday be an even longer running longest running show that has ever walked slowly up a flight of stairs. I absolutely love Jerry, Bart's future ex-wife's new soon to be ex-Alien lover. Nelson's mom still has to strip at the age of 87 because there is no more retirement. Even with 99 Democrats in the Senate, because the Republican still knows how to get things his way. Of course Ralph Wiggum will be the new chief of police, he is a chip off the old cop. Santa's Little Hybrid is an unnatural progression that Cosmo does not teach about."

Teresa Lopez of TV Fanatic gave the episode four out of five stars, saying "I always love The Simpsons episodes that show the possible futures of Bart, Lisa, Maggie, Homer and Marge. And this week was no exception. Even though the future episodes are not technically canon (I mean, who can say what will really happen in their future?), I liked that this one attempted some continuity.

The episode received a 1.7 rating and was watched by a total of 3.64 million people, making it the second most watched show on Animation Domination.

References

External links 
 
 "Days of Future Future"  at theSimpsons.com
  The plot description was adapted from Days of Future Future at Simpsons Wiki, which is available under a Creative Commons Attribution-Share Alike 3.0 license.

2014 American television episodes
Older versions of cartoon characters
The Simpsons (season 25) episodes
Television episodes about cloning
Television episodes about zombies
Science fiction comedy